Biserrula is a genus of flowering plants in the family Fabaceae, found in Portugal (including Madeira and Selvagens), the Canary Islands, all the Mediterranean countries, the Arabian peninsula, and in east Africa as far south as Tanzania. Biserrula pelecinus, generally called just "biserrula", is under domestication in Australia as a forage legume.

Species
Currently accepted species include:

Biserrula epiglottis (L.) Coulot, Rabaute & J.-M.Tison
Biserrula pelecinus L.

References

Faboideae
Fabaceae genera